Desert House may refer to:

Kaufmann Desert House, Palm Springs, California, United States
Wüstenhaus Schönbrunn, Vienna, Austria
Desart Court, historic houses near Cuffesgrange and Callan, County Kilkenny, Ireland.